Hallelujah! is a British television sitcom produced by Yorkshire Television that aired on ITV from 29 April 1983 to 21 December 1984.

The series was set in a Salvation Army citadel in the fictional Yorkshire town of Brigthorpe during series 1 (and later in the fictional place of Blackwick in series 2). Captain Emily Ridley (Thora Hird) has been posted there, having been an active member of the Salvation Army for 42 years. Despite the town and residents being seemingly pleasant, Emily is determined to flush out sin from behind the net curtains. Assisting Emily is her niece Alice Meredith (Patsy Rowlands).

The programme was a repeat collaboration between Hird and the creator Dick Sharples, who had worked together on the comedy series In Loving Memory between 1979 and 1986.

The series also featured guest appearances from the likes of Hird's Last of the Summer Wine co-star Michael Aldridge and television presenter Richard Whiteley.

Plot
The show was set in the Salvation Army based in the fictional Yorkshire town of Brigthorpe during Series 1, and in the equally fictional Yorkshire place of Blackwick during Series 2. Dame Thora Hird starred as Captain Emily Ridley, with Patsy Rowlands as her niece Alice Meredith and Rosamund Greenwood as Sister Dorothy Smith (who left after the first series and was later replaced by David Daker as Brother Benjamin in the second series).

A notable characteristic of the show was that every episode ended with the audience clapping once during the closing sequence throughout its year-long run.

Cast
Thora Hird - Captain Emily Ridley
Walter Gotell - Lt. Colonel Henderson 
Patsy Rowlands - Alice Meredith
Rosamund Greenwood - Sister Dorothy Smith (series 1)
David Daker - Brother Benjamin (series 2)
Geoffrey Bayldon - Mr Sedgewick
Michael Aldridge - Brig Langton (series 1)
Garfield Morgan - Brig Langton (series 2)

Episodes

Series 1 (1983)
Retirement (29 Apr 83)
Repentance (6 May 83)
Counselling (13 May 83)
Poor Box (20 May 83)
Luncheon Club (27 May 83)
Mobile Canteen (3 Jun 83)
Struck Down (10 Jun 83)

Series 2 (1984)
Marching Orders (2 Nov 84)
Just A Song At Twilight (9 Nov 84)
Holy Deadlock (16 Nov 84)
The Snake Pit : Part 1 (23 Nov 84)
The Snake Pit : Part 2 (30 Nov 84)
Rock Bottom (7 Dec 84)
It Happened One Night (14 Dec 84)
A Goose For Mrs. Scratchitt (Christmas Special) (21 Dec 84)

Only 15 episodes over two series were made though some sources claim that there were three series made. This is incorrect; there were only two series and one Christmas special shown between 1983 and 1984.

In 1985, it was reported that a continuation/sequel of the series was to be produced for BBC 2. This follow-on series ultimately never appeared; instead, Hird later that year signed up to play Edie Pegden, a character with a number of parallels to her Hallelujah! character Captain Emily Ridley, in Last of the Summer Wine, a role that was written especially for her by Roy Clarke when she became available.

Location filming
The series was filmed mostly in and around both Yorkshire Television Studios and the Leeds area. Most notable filming location was Leeds General Infirmary, especially appearances by old run-down buildings old and new around the Leeds-area at the time. Some scenes in the Christmas special were filmed in the Victorian street exhibition of the York Castle museum.
The opening sequence was filmed outside the Garden Gate pub in Hunslet.

DVD release
DD Home Entertainment (now known as 'Simply Home Entertainment') released series 1 and 2 in 2008. They claimed that series two was complete at first, However, as the Christmas special was not included, they later dropped this claim (the artwork on the cover stayed the same however) 

Both series of Hallelujah! and the Christmas Special are now available from Network DVD.

Hallelujah! has been released in Australia by Acorn Media Australia. It is a boxset with both series plus the Christmas special. It has been released as an all region DVD (PAL).

Notes

1. Lewisohn, Mark. Radio Times Guide to British Comedy p. 292.

External links

1983 British television series debuts
1984 British television series endings
ITV sitcoms
1980s British sitcoms
Television series by Yorkshire Television
Television shows set in Yorkshire
English-language television shows